The Rutgers School of Social Work (SSW) is one of the twenty-nine schools that makes up Rutgers University. U.S. News & World Report has routinely ranked it among the top schools for social work in the United States.

Background & Programs 
Established in 1954, the school today has more than 50 full-time faculty members and 150 part-time lecturers, and approximately 1,000 enrolled students. Classes are held at three Rutgers University campuses: Newark, New Brunswick and Camden. 

In 2008, Verizon Wireless started a $100,000 scholarship fund to the Center on Violence Against Women and Children at the School of Social Work. It was to be awarded annually to three graduate students specializing at the center.

The school includes several research centers, including the Center for Gambling Studies, the Center for International Social Work, the Center for Nonprofit Management and Governance, the Center on Violence Against Women and Children and the Institute for Families.

Certificates
The school also offers a variety of certificates that can be earned by attending day-long workshops. Certificates take at least one year and up to three years to complete.

Accreditation 
The School is fully accredited by the Council on Social Work Education and is authorized to award master's and baccalaureate degrees in Social Work.

References

External links
 

Rutgers University colleges and schools
Schools of social work in the United States
1954 establishments in New Jersey
Educational institutions established in 1954